Linda Ridgway (born 1947) is an American artist in Dallas, TX known for sculpting and printmaking works. Her focus is on themes of femininity, tradition, and heritage. Ridgway is known for her bronze wall reliefs.

Early life and education 
Ridgway was born in Jeffersonville, Indiana. She received a B.F.A. from the Louisville School of Art and an M.F.A. from Tulane University.

Style and work 
Ridgway's art piece how did you dare was inspired by Alice in wonderland which she takes whole series of prints from which she had done at flatbed press with Katherine Broomberry.Her art as she described it was sculpted paper and she added the quote "how do you dare" from Shakespeare. With multiple printings and stains of young girls dresses she made art and said the "sometimes the best start is the accident".

Career 
Ridgway has participated in various solo and group exhibitions including Linda Ridgway: A Survey, Poetics of Form at the Glassell School of Art at the Museum of Fine Arts, Houston, Texas and the Dallas Museum of Art, Texas in 1997 and 1998; and One Hundred Years: The Permanent Collection of the Modern Art Museum of Fort Worth at the Modern Art Museum of Fort Worth.

Ridgway was trained as a printmaker, but is best known for her delicate sculptures based on plants and clothing. Her vine-like bronze sculpture The Dance demonstrates this synthesis of bronze and plants. Her work is held in the public collections of the Dallas Museum of Art, the El Paso Museum of Art, the Modern Art Museum of Fort Worth, the Museum of Fine Arts, Houston, The Phillips Collection (Washington DC).

On June 26th, 2010 Ridgway participated in the Nasher Sculpture Center's 360 Speakers Series in which various sculptors appear to have conversations and lectures on the ever-changing definition of sculpture. The lecture itself was recorded and posted to the Nasher Sculpture Center's Youtube page.

Personal life 
Ridgway lives and works in Dallas, Texas. She is heavily influenced by her personal life and identity as a mother, daughter, and friend.

Further reading
 Bouchard, Kevin. “Linda Ridgway: Consider.” Artlies, Winter 2003-04: 76. 
 Dumbadze, Alexander. “Linda Ridgway: Poetry of Line, Women and Their Work.” Art Papers, September/October, 1998, p. 55-56. 
 Emenhiser, Karen. “Linda Ridgway.” Detour, June 1991, p. 71. 
 Graze, Sue, Linda Ridgway: A Survey, The Poetics of Form, Dallas, Dallas Museum of Art, 1997. 
 Moody, Tom. “Linda Ridgway.” Artforum, October 1991, p. 133-134. 
 Huerta, Benito. “Linda Ridgway „Visual Essays‟: Gerald Peters Gallery.” Artlies, Fall, 1996, p.44. 
 Lightman, Victoria Hodge. “Houston: Linda Ridgway.” Sculpture, March, 1998, p. 68. 
 Mitchell, Charles Dee. “Linda Ridgway at Gerald Peters.” Art in America, September, 1994. 
 Mitchell, Charles Dee. “Ridgway: Always keeping good form.” The Dallas Morning News, Sunday, January 18, 1998. 
 Robertson, Tracee W. “The Studio is the Heart of this House: Linda Ridgway,” Artl!es, Fall 2004. P. 34-35. 
Weinstein, Joel. “Linda Ridgway: The Dallas Museum of Art.” Artlies, Spring, 1998, p. 54.

References

American women sculptors
Modern sculptors
Living people
1947 births
21st-century American women artists
People from Jeffersonville, Indiana
Tulane University alumni